The Chong-Kemin is a river in Kemin District of Chüy Region of Kyrgyzstan. It is a right tributary of the Chu in the Boom Gorge.

Bibliography
 Chuy Oblast Encyclopedia. Kyrgyz Encyclopedia Chief Editorial Board. Bishkek, 1994 (in Kyrgyz and Russian).

References

Rivers of Kyrgyzstan
Tian Shan